Time Now Mr T was an Irish television sketch show that aired on RTÉ for one series in 1977. The show was written by and starred Niall Tóibín.

References

1970s Irish television series
Irish television sketch shows
RTÉ original programming